The given Foster is a variation of the surname Forster, meaning one who 'works in the forest'. It may also derive from the French forcetier, meaning 'maker of scissors'. It is both a given name and a surname.

The use of Foster as a given name has increased in recent years, and was the 1063rd most popular boys name in 2022, up 251 spots from 2021.

Notable people with the surname "Foster" include

A
Foster Awintiti Akugri (born 1994), Ghanaian entrepreneur
Foster Andersen (1940–2014), American football player
Foster Appiah (born 2000), Ghanaian footballer

B
Foster Bastios (born 1975), Ghanaian footballer
Foster Bell (1814–1857), British jockey
Foster Blackburne (1838–1909), English archdeacon
Foster Blodgett (1827–1877), American politician
Foster Brooks (1912–2001), American actor

C
Foster Calder (1873–1960), Canadian politician
Foster Campbell (born 1947), American politician
Foster Castleman (1931–2020), American baseball player
Foster Samuel Chipman (1829–??), American politician
Foster Dwight Coburn (1846–1924), American farmer
Foster Cummings (born 1973), Trinidadian politician
Foster Cunliffe (1875–1916), English historian
Foster Cunliffe (rugby union) (1854–1927), English rugby union footballer

D
Foster DeWitt (born 1996), Canadian rugby union footballer
Foster Rhea Dulles (1900–1970), American journalist
Foster A. Dunlap (1905–1978), American politician

E
Foster Edwards (1903–1980), American baseball player

F
Foster Felger (1908–1984), American politician
Foster Fitzsimmons (1912–1991), American novelist
Foster Friess (1940–2021), American investment manager
Foster Furcolo (1911–1995), American politician
Foster Fyans (1790–1870), Irish military officer

G
Foster Griffin (born 1995), American baseball player
Foster Gunnison Jr. (1925–1994), American activist

H
Foster Hedley (1908–1983), English footballer
Foster Hewitt (1902–1985), Canadian radio broadcaster
Foster Hirsch (born 1943), American author
Foster Horan (born 1992), Irish rugby union footballer
Foster Hutchinson (1724–1799), American judge
Foster Hutchinson (Canadian judge) (1761–1815), Canadian judge

L
Foster C. LaHue (1917–1996), American general
Foster Langsdorf (born 1995), American soccer player

M
Foster Malone (1887–1926), Canadian ice hockey player
Foster G. McGaw (1897–1986), American philanthropist
Foster E. Mohrhardt (1907–1992), American librarian
Foster Moreau (born 1997), American football player

N
Foster Namwera (born 1986), Malawian footballer

P
Foster B. Porter (1891–1965), American politician
Foster Powell (1734–1793), English athlete
Foster Provost, American computer scientist

R
Foster Robinson (1880–1967), English cricketer
Foster Rockwell (1880–1942), American football player

S
Foster Sarell (born 1998), American football player
Foster J. Sayers (1924–1944), American soldier
Foster Waterman Stearns (1881–1956), American politician
Foster Stockwell (born 1929), American writer
Foster Sylvers (born 1962), American singer-songwriter

V
Foster McGowan Voorhees (1865–1927), American politician

W
Foster Watkins (1917–2002), American football player
Foster Neville Woodward (1905–1985), British chemist

Z
Foster Barham Zincke (1817–1893), English clergyman

See also
Foster (surname), a page for people with the surname "Foster"
Foster (disambiguation), a disambiguation page for "Foster"

Notes